The Cape petrel (Daption capense), also called the Cape pigeon, pintado petrel, or Cape fulmar, is a common seabird of the Southern Ocean from the family Procellariidae. It is the only member of the genus Daption, and is allied to the fulmarine petrels, and the giant petrels. They are extremely common seabirds with an estimated population of around 2 million.

Taxonomy
The Cape petrel was formally described by the Swedish naturalist Carl Linnaeus in 1758 in the tenth edition of his Systema Naturae under the binomial name Procellaria capensis. Linnaeus cited the "white and black spotted peteril" that had been described and illustrated in 1747 by the English naturalist George Edwards in the second volume of his A Natural History of Uncommon Birds. The Cape petrel is now the only species placed in the genus Daption that was introduced in 1826 by English naturalist James Francis Stephens. The genus name Daption is an anagram of the Portuguese name "Pintado" which was given to the species by navigators because of its piebald plumage. Pintado is from Latin pinctus meaning "painted". The specific epithet capense signifies the Cape of Good Hope, the locality where the type specimen was collected. The word petrel is derived from Saint Peter and the story of his walking on water. This is in reference to the petrel's habit of appearing to run on the water to take off.

All Procellariiformes share certain identifying features. First, they have nasal passages that attach to the upper bill called naricorns. The bills of Procellariiformes are also unique in that they are split into between seven and nine horny plates. They produce a stomach oil made up of wax esters and triglycerides that is stored in the proventriculus. This can be sprayed out of their mouths as a defence against predators and as an energy rich food source for chicks and for the adults during their long flights. Finally, they also have a salt gland that is situated above the nasal passage and helps desalinate their bodies, due to the high amount of ocean water that they imbibe. It excretes a high saline solution from their nose.

Two subspecies are recognised:
 D. c. capense (Linnaeus, 1758) – breeds on circumpolar subantarctic islands
 D. c. australe Mathews, 1913 – breeds on New Zealands subantarctic islands

Description
The Cape petrel has a black head and neck, and a white belly, breast, and its underwing is white with a black border. Its back, and upperwings are black and white speckled, as is its tail which also has a band of black.

Distribution and habitat
During breeding season, Cape petrels feed around Antarctica's shelf and during the winter they range further north, as far as Angola and the Galapagos Islands. They breed on many islands of Antarctica and the subantarctic islands, some going as far as the Auckland Islands, the Chatham Islands, Campbell Island. Their main breeding grounds are on the Antarctic Peninsula, South Georgia, the Balleny Islands, the Kerguelen Islands, as well as islands in the Scotia Sea.

Behaviour

Diet
The Cape petrels' diet is 80% crustaceans, as well as fish and squid. Krill is their favourite crustacean, which they obtain by surface seizing as well as diving under water and filtering them out. They are also well known for following ships and eating edible waste and carcasses thrown overboard. They are aggressive while feeding and will spit their stomach oil at competitors, even their own species.

Breeding

They are colonial birds, and nest on cliffs or level ground within a kilometre of the ocean. They tend to have smaller colonies than other petrels. Their nests are formed with pebbles and are placed under overhanging rock for protection, or in a crevice. In November they lay a single clear white egg, which is incubated for 45 days by both sexes. The egg usually measures . Like most other fulmars, they will defend their nest by spitting stomach oil. Skuas in particular will prey on Cape petrel eggs and chicks. Upon hatching, the chick is brooded for ten days until it can thermoregulate, after which both parents assist in the feeding. The chicks fledge after 45 more days, around March.

Conservation
Consequently, the IUCN rates them as least concern.

Gallery

References

Sources

External links

Birds of Antarctica
Procellariidae
Birds of New Zealand
Birds of Tasmania
Birds of the Southern Ocean
Birds of Southern Africa
Birds of islands of the Atlantic Ocean
Birds of subantarctic islands
Birds of the Indian Ocean
Birds described in 1758
Taxa named by Carl Linnaeus
Fauna of Heard Island and McDonald Islands